Adéla Odehnalová (born 2 January 1990) is a former Czech football defender, who last played for Sparta Praha in the Czech First Division.

She was a member of the Czech national team.

References

External links
 
 
 

1990 births
Living people
Czech women's footballers
Czech Republic women's international footballers
Sportspeople from Hradec Králové
Women's association football defenders
SK Slavia Praha (women) players
AC Sparta Praha (women) players
Czech Women's First League players